"The Dreaming" is the title song from Kate Bush's fourth studio album The Dreaming and was released a single on 26 July 1982. "The Dreaming" made it to No. 48 on the UK Singles Chart.

The song is about the destruction of Aboriginal Australians' traditional lands by white Australians in their quest for weapons-grade uranium. Musical guest Rolf Harris plays the didgeridoo on the recording, and bird impersonator Percy Edwards provided sheep noises. The title is based on The Dreaming, a concept in Aboriginal mythology.

The original title for the track was "The Abo Song", which unwittingly made use of a racial slur; promotional 7-inch copies were circulated before being recalled. A 12-inch version of the single was also mooted but ultimately rejected by EMI for "not being commercially viable".

An alternative version of "The Dreaming", entitled "Dreamtime", was used as the UK single B-side. It is usually referred to as an instrumental version of "The Dreaming". This is not strictly true, in that while the track omits all the sung lead vocal lyrics, it still retains most of the backing vocals, such as the stretched dreamtime harmonies heard during the chorus. It is also of note that "Dreamtime" contains both an extended intro and outro. It starts with approximately 4 bars of double-tracked didgeridoo drone before the original arrangement comes in and finishes with approximately 30 seconds of the same following a breakdown of the original arrangement. At the very end, Harris can be heard saying "...and stuff like that".

The cover art is by Del Palmer, Bush's partner at the time and sometime bass player. It features a depiction of the Wandjina, a sky spirit in Western Australian traditions. Wandjinas brought the law, culture and language.

Personnel
Kate Bush – lead and backing vocals; piano; Fairlight CMI
Paddy Bush – bullroarer; backing vocals
Rolf Harris – didgeridoo
Stuart Elliott – drums
Percy Edwards – animal sounds
Gosfield Goers – crowd noises

Charts

See also
Songline

References

Kate Bush songs
1982 singles
Songs written by Kate Bush
1981 songs
EMI Records singles